Doppelkopf (lit. double-head), sometimes abbreviated to Doko, is a trick-taking card game for four players. 

In Germany, Doppelkopf is nearly as popular as Skat, especially in Northern Germany and the Rhein-Main Region. Schafkopf, however, is still the preferred trick-taking variant in Bavaria. As with Skat, there are numerous variants; unlike Skat, Doppelkopf has no "official" ruleset.

Although the German Doppelkopf Association (Deutscher Doppelkopf-Verband) has developed standard rules for tournaments, informal sessions are often played in many different variants, and players adopt their own house rules. Before playing with a new group of players, it is advisable to agree on a specific set of rules before the first game.

History 
The origins of this game are not well known, but its earliest rules appear under the name Doppelschafkopf in 1890 and other descriptions appear in the early 20th century Its mode of play and its earlier name of Doppelschafkopf point to an origin in the game of Bavarian Schafkopf. However, it has become very much a north German game.

Game rules 
Note: In the following section, the most common rules are described.

General principles 
Doppelkopf is a team game, often with two players per team. As with Schafkopf, the pairing is not known from the start.

The card deck consists of either 48 or 40 cards:
 Eight Aces or deuces worth 11 points each
 Eight tens worth 10 points each
 Eight kings worth four points each
 Eight queens or obers worth three points each
 Eight jacks or Unters worth two points each
 Eight nines worth zero points each (these may be dropped)

Each set of eight cards consists of two cards from each suit. Thus, each card exists twice in the deck (hence the name Doppelkopf), resulting in a total number of 240 points. In the ensuing description, the more common 48-card version is assumed. The rules for the 40-card variant are the same; the only difference is that the nines are removed. 

If French-suited cards are used, the suits are diamonds , hearts , spades  and clubs . If German-suited cards are used, the suits are bells , hearts , leaves  and acorns . The ace is replaced by the deuce or daus (A), the queen by the ober (O), and the jack by the unter (U).

In every game, there are two parties, called Re and Kontra. To win, the Re team normally has to achieve 121 points or more; Kontra wins when Re fails to do so.

Preparation 
Each player is dealt 12 cards (or 10 in the 40-card variant). After the cards are dealt, the type of game is determined. In non-tournament play, it is assumed that a normal game will be played and any player desiring a different game simply says so. In tournament games, a more complicated method is used to prevent players from gaining information about their opponents' hands.

The types of contracts that can be played only differ in which cards are considered trumps. When a player declares a game other than the normal game, that player alone is Re and must play against the other three players who form Kontra. These non-standard games are, therefore, called solo games.

In the normal game, the players who hold the queens of clubs (Die Alten = "the old women" or "the elders") or obers of acorns constitute Re, while the other two are Kontra. In these games, the actual teams are not known from the start. When a player has both queens of clubs or obers of acorns, that player declares a marriage (Hochzeit).

Playing 
The player to the left of the dealer, forehand, leads to the first trick; the other players follow in a clockwise direction. Each player must follow suit, that is, play a card of the led suit. If he is unable to do so, he can play a trump or any other card. The player playing the highest trump or the highest card in the led suit wins the trick and leads to the next trick. Since each card exists twice, there is the possibility of a tie; in that case, the first-played card wins the trick. For example, when the trick consists of ♠10 ♠A ♠9 ♠A, the player who played the first ace of spades wins the trick.

During the first trick, each player may make announcements, which increases the value of the game.

After all the cards have been played, the point values (card points) of the tricks are counted and each player in the winning team gets the game value (game points) added to his score, while the losing players have that value deducted.

Contracts

Choosing a contract 
This is sometimes referred to as "the auction" or as "bidding". When this action is referred to as "bidding" the action normally named bidding (the section below) referred to as "announcements".

Choosing a contract consists of a single round starting with the forehand to the dealer's left.

Each player says either "OK" (Gesund = "healthy"), meaning, that they are content to play a normal game, or "special" (Vorbehalt = "reservation") meaning that they want to play some other type of game. If one or more players have said "special", they each, in turn, say what type of game they wish to play. Whoever has the highest-ranking "special" plays their game (the first player in bidding order winning in the case of a draw).

The possible contracts, from lowest-ranking to highest-ranking, are:

 Marriage (Hochzeit)
 Voluntary solo (Lustsolo, various types)
 Compulsory solo (Pflichtsolo, various types)

Normal game 

The 10 of hearts (often called the Dulle) is the highest trump in every normal game as well as any suit solo. Except for hearts solo, there are actually more trumps than non-trump cards. One noteworthy result of this rule is that there are only six non-trump cards left in hearts, making this suit more likely to be trumped in the first trick it is played. The normal game in a version suitable for children and beginners was released in 2019 under the name Doublehead Kids in cooperation with the German Doppelkopf Association.

Marriage 
When a player has both queens of clubs or obers of acorns, he usually declares "marriage" (Hochzeit). This will form a partnership, the red team, with the first other players to win a trick. Apart from this, the game is played like a normal game. If, however, the player who declares "marriage" makes the first three tricks, he will instead play a diamond solo game against the other players.

The player can also decide not to announce marriage, in which case he plays a silent solo (stilles Solo). This is played like a normal diamond solo; the only difference being that the other players do not know from the start they are playing against a solo. Apart from this, the game is scored like a normal solo (times three for soloist, normal for all others).

Solo games 

A player can announce a solo game if he would like to. These games change the status of trump cards; the player also must play against the other three players. He will get thrice game value-added (or subtracted) from his scoreboard in case of a win (or a loss).

The kinds of solo games are, according to the official rules:

 Jack solo / Unter solo (Bubensolo) with only jacks or unters as trump cards;
 Queen solo / Ober solo (Damensolo) with only queens or obers as trumps;
 Ace solo (Fleischlos = "meat-free" or Knochenmann = "skeleton") where no trumps exist;
 Suit solo  or trump solo (Farbensolo) which makes the announced suit along with jacks and queens/obers and unters trump cards. A "diamond solo", therefore, has the same trumps as in a normal game.

Bids 
During play, a player may make announcements claiming that his team will succeed in achieving a specific goal. These announcements increase the game value regardless of whether they are fulfilled. If a team fails to accomplish the self-given goal, they automatically lose.

Apart from increasing the game value, the bids fulfill the role of clarifying which side the player who makes them belongs to.

The bids that are possible are: 
 "Double" (Re) or "counter-double" (Kontra), announcing that the player is part of the Re (Kontra) team and his team will score more than 120 points. Note that this means that, in the case of an announced Kontra, the Kontra team must now make 121 points instead of 120 to win the game, unless Re is also announced. Either of these announcements also tells all other players whether they play against or with the announcer.
Each of the following announcements can only be made after Re or Kontra. If, for example, Re was said and a player of the Kontra team wants to make an announcement, he also has to announce Kontra. If Re was announced by one player and his partner wants to make an additional announcement, he also has to identify himself as being on the Re team before being able to do so.
 No 90 (Keine 90), often abbreviated to "no 9" (keine 9), meaning that the opponents will get less than 90 points
 No 60 (Keine 60), or "No 6" (keine 6), announces the opposing team will not make 60 points
 No 30 (Keine 30) / no 3 (keine 3)
 Schwarz, meaning the opponents will not get a single trick, not even a trick worth zero points

Each announcement implies any previous announcements, for example, "no 60" implies "no 90" and "Re"/"Kontra", increasing the game-value by 4 (for the standard rules) points. Every bid may be countered by "Kontra" resp. "Re" when the opponents think the goal will not be met. For example, if the Re-Party announces "Re, no 60", a reply of "Kontra" simply claims Kontra will score 60 points.

To be able to make a bid, the player must still hold a specific number of cards in his/her hands, the official rules state:
 A Re or Kontra can be made with 11 cards left (that is, before the player plays his second card; it does not require the announcement to be made before the first card of the second trick is played).
 For No 90, 10 cards must be held.
 No 60 (keine 60): Nine cards
 No 30 (keine 30): Eight cards
 Schwarz: Seven cards

A player that has, for example, announced "Re", but not "no 90", may not announce "no 60" with 9 cards left, because the implied "no 90" would not be legal.

A Kontra/Re in response to a bid of the opposing team may be made until one-trick later, e.g. a player can say "Kontra" in response to "Re/no 90" as long as he holds nine cards, regardless of when "Re" and "no 90" was announced.

When, in the case of a marriage, the partner is found with the second (third) trick, all players need to hold one card (two cards) less than in a normal game in order to make their announcements. A player may not make an announcement before a partner has been found.

Ansagen/Absagen 
The official rules distinguish between "Ansagen" (announcements) and "Absagen" (lit. rejection, but probably used as a pun). There, an initial "Re" or "Kontra" is an "Ansage", and all other announcements ("Keine ..." and "Schwarz") are "Absagen".

Scoring 
After all cards are played, each team counts the points of their tricks (since the total sum of points always is 240, in theory only one team has to count; letting both parties count serves as verification). The game value is calculated as follows:

 1 point base value ("won the game")
 +1 if the winning team is Kontra ("gegen die Alten", against the elders) unless a solo is played
 +2 for an announcement of Re
 +2 for an announcement of Kontra
 +1 if the losing team has less than 90 points
 +1 if No 90 was announced
 +1 if the winning team won with more than 120 points against an announcement of No 90
 +1 if the losing team has less than 60 points
 +1 if No 60 was announced
 +1 if the winning team won with at least 90 points against an announcement of No 60
 +1 if the losing team has less than 30 points
 +1 if No 30 was announced
 +1 if the winning team won with at least 60 points against an announcement of No 30
 +1 if the winning team made all tricks
 +1 if Schwarz was announced
 +1 if the winning team won with at least 30 points against an announcement of Schwarz

Extra score points 
Unless a solo is played, the following additional score points can be made during the game, which affects the game value. There are no extra points in a solo game, not even in a silent solo (when a marriage is not announced).

Catching the fox 
If a team's ace of diamonds, known as the fox (Fuchs), is won by the opposing team, the opposing team scores an extra point.

Doppelkopf 

A trick containing 40 or more points (four Volle, i.e. tens and aces) scores an extra point for the team that collected the trick.

Charlie Miller 
If a team's jack of clubs, dubbed "Charlie Miller" (Karlchen Müller), wins the last trick, the team scores an extra point.

Score of each player 
The game value is added to the score of each player on the winning team and subtracted for the losing team. If the game was a solo game, the soloist gets thrice the game value added or subtracted. This rule ensures the total sum of points won/lost in a round is always zero.

Examples 
The following examples show the scoring as stated in the official rules.

 No bids were made, Re wins with 131 points.
 Game was won: +1
 Both Re players get +1, both Kontra -1.
 Kontra, no 60 was announced, Kontra gets 183 points.
 Game was won: +1
 Won against the elders: +1
 Kontra was announced: +2
 Losing team has less than 90 points: +1
 No 90 was announced: +1
 Losing team has less than 60 points: +1
 No 60 was announced: +1
 Both Kontra players get +8, both Re -8.
 Re, no 60 was announced, Kontra team said Kontra. Kontra gets 60 points and therefore wins.
 Game was won: +1
 Won against the elders: +1
 Re was announced: +2
 Kontra was announced: +2
 No 90 was announced: +1
 No 60 was announced: +1
 Both Kontra players get +8, both Re -8.
 Re, no 60 was announced, Kontra team said Kontra. Kontra gets 90 points.
 In addition to the previous example, Kontra got 90+ points against the No 60 announcement: +1
 Both Kontra-players get +9, both Re -9.
 A Soloist wins without announcements with 153 points.
 Game was won: +1
 Losing team has less than 90 points: +1
 Soloist gets +6, all others -2.
 Soloist announces Re, keine 90 but only manages to get 87 points for himself.
 Game was won: +1
 Re was announced: +2
 No 90 was announced: +1
 Kontra got 120+ points against Re's No 90 announcement: +1
 Losing soloist has less than 90 points: +1
 Soloist gets -18, all others +6.

Tactics 
Suggested tactics shown here come from the Pagat website.

Leads 
The "first of equal cards wins" rule makes it important to lead one's ace of a non-trump suit before an opponent can lead theirs, as the second round is almost certain to be trumped - there are only eight cards in a suit (six in hearts). It is recommended to avoid leading the second round of hearts, because of the danger of giving a ruff and discard to the opponents, since there are only six cards in the suit.

Therefore, if leading at the start, one would normally lead:

 a single black ace (shortest suit first with both club and spade single aces);
 a single ace of hearts;
 an ace from a pair.

After this, players should try to give the lead to their partner:
 If leading on the Re side, players would lead a trump to their partner's queen of clubs.
 If on the Kontra side players may lead a side suit. However, if their partner has said Kontra players should lead a trump as they should have at least one 10 of hearts.

Trumping 
If one is trumping, and there is a possibility of being overtrumped, it is key to try trump, at least, a jack so that the fourth player cannot win with a fox or 10 of trumps. Similarly, if trumps are led then if one is the last player of the team to play the trick, with one or both opponents playing after, play a jack or higher if no high card has been played so far.

Announcements 
Players must announce Re or Kontra if things seem to be going well, not only to increase the score for the game but also so that they can announce "no 90" if things continue to go well.

Announcing Re or Kontra earlier than when one needs to, for example, on the first play rather than the second, indicates possession of additional strength (similar conceptually to jump bidding in Contract Bridge).

If on the opening lead the fourth player says Re or Kontra before second-hand plays, this indicates that they are going to trump the lead and want their partner to put a valuable card on it.

Marriage Announcements 
It is generally correct to announce a marriage and rarely profitable to go solo.

It is desirable to partner with marriage as one's partner normally has at least 2 high trumps.

When leading against a marriage, players might lead a 10 of hearts to win the trick; otherwise, they could lead an ace in their shortest suit.

Solo games 
When considering a solo, the initial lead is a big advantage. Trumping solos require a much stronger hand than expected, and these hands would also play well in a normal game. For an ace solo, a five-card suit to A A 10 will normally capture over 60 points. For a queen or jack solo, four trumps are sufficient with a reasonable number of aces.

See also note on solo games in tournament play below.

90/60/30 announcements 
Care must be taken with 90/60/30 announcements as they change the target. It can be very rash gambling one extra point against the possible loss of the whole game.

Tournament Play 
It is highly likely that a player will not get a hand warranting a solo bid during the session. A compulsory solo, particularly towards the end, should almost always have Kontra said if the declarer does not say Re to increase the game value when the soloist loses.

Variants

Poverty 
A person with three or fewer trumps can say "special" (Vorbehalt) and then announce "poverty" (Armut). If no one has a better special, the person announcing poverty places three cards containing all the poverty player's trumps face down on the table. A player who wishes to partner (preference being given clockwise from the poverty player - if nobody wishes to partner then the hand is redealt by the same dealer) the poverty player has the right to take these three cards (without seeing them first) and then discard any three cards, which are returned to the poverty player. The returned cards may contain trumps and may include cards originally passed.

Without nines  
Many groups remove the nines so that there are 40 cards left. This way, there are no more dummy cards and the balance between trumps and non-trumps is shifted even more towards trumps. Such a game might be called Sharp Doppelkopf (scharfer Doppelkopf) or "without nines" (ohne Neunen) or "without blanks" (ohne Luschen).

Wedding 
Some variants allow the wedding (Hochzeit) player to announce a specific kind of trick that must be taken, e.g. the first non-trump trick. However, this is usually not a good idea since it is in the interest of the wedding player to find a "strong" partner, e.g., one with a 10 of hearts.

Dullen 
It may be agreed that - as the only exception - the second 10 of hearts is considered higher than the first if both are played in the same trick. In some variants, this is true for all but the last trick, where the first 10 of hearts is considered higher. Playing this variant makes the game less predictable because some conventions (such as playing a 10 of hearts in the first trick by a Re player, or to marry a wedding player) cannot be used anymore.

Forced announcement 
If a player collects 30 points or more in the first trick (not counting the tricks needed to determine the partners after a wedding has been announced), he has to announce either Re or Kontra. This is a "forced announcement" (Pflichtansage). This variation is often played in games "without nines".

Some players even insist that a further announcement (i.e. 90) be made if the announcement in question has been made already.
This rule is popular among recreational players in order to render the game more dynamic.

Catching a fox in the final trick 
Losing an Ace of Diamonds to the opposing team in the last trick of the game may lead to two extra points (instead of one) counted against the team losing the fox.

Piglets 
When one player has both foxes (aces of diamonds) on his hand, he announces "piglets" (Schweinchen). That means, that these cards become the highest trumps in play, outranking the dullen (tens of hearts) and Alten (queens of clubs). It may be played that a piglet forces the player to an announcement of Kontra or Re. Other variants include the announcement at any point during the game, often breaking the opposing team's bid or the possibility of super piglets, if one holds both nines of diamonds. In some variants, only the first played fox becomes a piglet at the top of the trump suit while the second one still ranks low.

Super piglets 
Only when piglets is announced does super piglets become possible. When one player has announced piglets and a player has both nines of diamonds on his hand, the player with the nines of diamonds may announce super piglets. That means, those nines of diamonds become the highest trumps in play, outranking the piglets, the Dullen and Alten.

Lost Charlie 
As a variant, a jack of clubs may be also scored if a team loses it to the opposing team in the last trick. If a player loses their jack of clubs to their partner, no point is counted. Many groups play "Lizzie Miller" (Lieschen Müller or Karola Müller or Karlchen Killer): Only if the queen of diamonds catches the opponent's jack of clubs in the last trick one point is scored. A Charlie Miller lost to another higher trump is not scored.

Five nines 
Some groups of players use a rule that a player holding five or more nines (Fünf Neuner) may, before the bidding, reveal their hand and demand a re-deal. Some groups that follow this rule also use a similar rule for hands with five or more kings.

Half a chicken 
Under this house rule, a player may bid "half a chicken" upon being dealt both tens of diamonds. This bid does nothing - but a gentleman should bid it regardless.

Tournament play 
Tournaments are played over a series of sessions, each of 24 deals. Each session having 20 normal hands plus four compulsory solos (or 25 hands with five solos for five players at a table).

Compulsory solos 
Each player must bid one "compulsory" solo during the session. He/she may bid other "lust" solos if desired. The first solo each player bids is their compulsory solo, and they lead.

Following the hand, the same dealer deals again.

A compulsory solo ranks above a lust solo in the bidding; if more than one player wants to play a compulsory solo, the bidding order overrules.

Failure to bid a solo 
If a player fails to bid a solo by the end of a session, an additional hand is dealt on which they must bid solo (vorführen (showing up)).

Conventions

Essen system 
The Essen system is a system of conventions used in Doppelkopf in accordance with the rules of the German Doppelkopf Association.

See also 
 Sheepshead (game)
 Skat
 Ombre

Footnotes

References

Literature 
 Brockhaus J. A. (1911). Brockhaus' Kleines Konversations-Lexikon, 5th edn., Vol. 2. Leipzig.
 Ulmann, S. (1890). Das Buch der Familienspiele. A. Hartleben, Vienna, Munich and Pest.

External links 
 Doppelkopf Strategy in English 20 Basic rules in Doppelkopf for beginners
 Deutscher Doppelkopf Verband e. V. where the official rules (in German) can be downloaded
 Concise Doppelkopf Rules (with 1-page pdf for download)
Doublehead Kids on Boardgamegeek
"The Essener System" (www.skatonline.de) (Google Translate)
 "The Essener System" (www.rasche-software.de) (English)

Schafkopf group
Year of introduction missing
Four-player card games
French deck card games
German deck card games
Point-trick games